11-20-79 is the debut studio album by American R&B singer Mona Lisa, released via Island on June 11, 1996 in North America. The album is named after her date of birth. It serves as the artist's only studio album as of 2022.

Release and reception

The album peaked at thirty-eight on the R&B Albums chart.

Track listing
Source: Discogs

Chart history

Album

Singles

"—" denotes releases that did not chart.

Personnel
Information taken from Allmusic.
assistant engineering – Won Allen, Chris Habeck, Mark Nixdorf, Max Vargus
composing – G. Duncan, The Flex, Darren Floyd, D. Guppy, Reese Johnson, Tim "Dawg" Patterson, Darrin Whittington
engineering – Mike Anzelowitz, Chris Barnett, Louis Christian, Jim Janik, Kenny Ortiz, Kieran Walsh
executive production – Hiriam Hicks, Tim "Dawg" Patterson
mastering – Herb Powers
mixing – Chris Barnett, Louis Christian, Russell Elevado, Jim Janik, Kieran Walsh
photography – Eric Johnson
production – Bob Antoine, Stanley Brown, Clark Kent, Andre Evans, Reese Johnson, Benjamin Love, Mr. Sexxx, Tim "Dawg" Patterson, The Red Head, Joe Wilson
vocal arranging – Ali Shaheed Muhammad, Rachel Oden, Trina Powell, Andre Robinson

References

1996 debut albums
Mona Lisa (singer) albums
PolyGram albums
Albums produced by Clark Kent (producer)